Michael Bergdahl is a (former) executive, author, and professional business speaker.

Background 
Bergdahl worked in Bentonville, Arkansas, for Wal-Mart, as the Director of People for the headquarters office, where he worked directly with Wal-Mart's founder Sam Walton. It was he who gave Bergdahl the nickname, "Bird Dawg". Previous to Wal-Mart he worked in the FMCG Industry for PepsiCo's Frito-Lay division in the sales organization and headquarters staff assignments.

Author 
Bergdahl's first book, What I Learned from Sam Walton, is about the strategies of Wal-Mart, the world's largest company. His second book, The ten rules of Sam Walton, is about the tactics of the world's richest man. His books were published by Wiley, and have been translated into Russian, Thai, Indonesian, Korean, Simplified Chinese, Traditional Chinese, Vietnamese, and Spanish.

References

External links 
 

Business speakers
Living people
Year of birth missing (living people)